The Shenyang J-15 (Chinese: 歼-15), also known as Flying Shark (NATO reporting name: Flanker-X2, is a Chinese all-weather, twinjet, carrier-based fourth-generation multirole fighter aircraft developed by the Shenyang Aircraft Corporation (SAC) and the 601 Institute, specifically for the People's Liberation Army Naval Air Force (PLANAF) to serve on People's Liberation Army Navy's aircraft carriers.

An unfinished prototype Su-33, the T-10K-3, was acquired by SAC from Ukraine in 2001 and was said to have been studied extensively and reverse-engineered, with development on the J-15 beginning immediately afterward. While the J-15 appears to be structurally based on the prototype of Su-33, the fighter features indigenous Chinese technologies as well as avionics from the Shenyang J-11B program. In February 2018, discussions about replacing the aircraft appeared in several Chinese media outlets including Xinhua and China's main military newspaper, discussing that it belongs to the 4th- or 4.5-generation fighters. Thus, the J-15 is viewed as an interim carrier-based fighter until a fifth-generation successor enters service, one that may be based on the Chengdu J-20 or Shenyang FC-31.

Development 
China has sought to purchase Su-33s from Russia on several occasions — an unsuccessful offer was made as late as March 2009 — but negotiations collapsed in 2006 after it was discovered that China had developed a modified version of the Sukhoi Su-27SK, designated the Shenyang J-11B, in violation of intellectual property agreements. However, according to Chinese sources, the reason China withdrew from talks was that Russia wanted large payments to re-open Su-33 production lines and insisted on a Chinese purchase of at least 50 Su-33s, about which China was reluctant as it believed the aircraft would become outdated in a few years. China hence decided on an indigenous variant instead of continuing to assemble the J-11, the licensed Chinese version of Su-27. 

The J-15 program was officially started in 2006 with the codename Flying Shark. The program goal was to develop a naval-capable fighter aircraft from the Shenyang J-11, with technologies reverse-engineered from T-10K-3, a Soviet Su-33 prototype acquired from Ukraine. The first J-15 prototype made its maiden flight on August 31, 2009, believed to be powered by Russian-supplied Saturn AL-31 turbofan engines. Video and still images of the flight were released in July 2010, showing the same basic airframe design as the Su-33.

On May 6, 2010, the aircraft conducted its first takeoff from a simulated ski-jump on land. On November 25, 2012, the aircraft successfully performed its first takeoff and landing on Liaoning, China's first operational aircraft carrier.

The twin-seat variant, J-15S, made its maiden flight on November 4, 2012. The twin-seat electronic warfare variant, similar to the role of United States Navy's EA-18G Growler, dubbed J-15D, took its made flight in 2018.

In 2016, the J-15T prototype with CATOBAR capability began test flight at PLA Navy land-based catapult facilities. In November 2020, Jane's reported that SAC had produced a second prototype of the J-15T fighter aircraft.

In 2021, military analysts reported that China has worked on an upgraded variant called J-15B, with new avionics, engines, and CATOBAR launch capability. The upgrade variant of J-15 is capable of launching newer PL-10 and PL-15 missiles.

In November 2022, a production J-15 powered by the Shenyang WS-10, possibly the WS-10B, appeared in Chinese media. It was the last indigenous Chinese combat aircraft to replace the AL-31; possibly due to navalisation. According to Chinese observers, compared to the AL-31 the WS-10 had superior safety, reliability, and service life, aspects which are magnified by the constraints of carrier aviation.

Design

The airframe of the J-15 is structurally reinforced for carrier landing and launching, with the addition of a tailhook and strengthened landing gears. The aircraft incorporated a higher portion of composite materials than the Sukhoi Su-33 to save weight and improve aerodynamic performance, allowing for a slower landing speed compared to Su-33.

An article in the China SignPost believes the J-15 "likely exceeds or matches the aerodynamic capabilities of virtually any fighter aircraft currently operated by regional militaries, except for the U.S. F-22 Raptor", alleging that the J-15 likely possesses a 10% greater thrust-to-weight ratio and 25% lower wing loading than the F/A-18E/F Super Hornet. However, one of the authors of that same article described the J-15 in another article as no game changer; the reliance on ski-jump launches and lack of Chinese carrier-based aerial refueling capabilities are believed to greatly reduce its effective combat range. In 2014, it was revealed that the J-15 is capable of aerial refueling, using the UPAZ-1 buddy refueling pod, which can be carried by another J-15. Hu Siyuan of the PLA National Defense University said that "the current weak point of the J-15 is its Russian-made AL-31 engines, which are less powerful than that of the American F-35 fighter".

The J-15's chief designer, Sun Cong of the National Committee of the Chinese People's Political Consultative Conference, has said that the J-15 could match the F/A-18 in bomb load, combat radius and mobility. However, in a similar statement, he said more work was required on its electronics and combat systems. Rear Admiral Yin Zhuo stated that the aircraft's air combat capabilities were better than that of the F/A-18E/F Super Hornet. However, he also stated that its ability to attack land and sea targets was slightly inferior to the F/A-18E/F; it is also stated that its electronic equipment meets the standards of those on a fifth-generation fighter.

J-15 is capable of operating on the aircraft carrier Liaoning and her sister ship Shandong. The carriers have two launch positions. The waist position has a runway length of 195 m, and the two forward positions have a runway length of 105 m. The take-off weight of the J-15 depends on the launch position and carrier speed. For ship speed at 28 knots, J-15's maximum take-off weight is 33 tons (with 9 tons of internal fuel and a 6.5-ton external payload) for the waist position. The maximum weight is 28 tons (9-ton internal fuel and 1.5-ton external payload) for the forward position. However, when the carrier moves at 20 knots, MTOW at the waist position is reduced to 31 tons. With the introduction of aircraft carrier Fujian and J-15B, MTOW will maintain at 33 ton at any launch position and ship speed.

Operational history

On November 25, 2012, Chinese media announced that two J-15s had made successful arrested landings on the  aircraft carrier. The first pilot to land on Liaoning was named as Dai Mingmeng (戴明盟). Luo Yang, the aircraft's head of production and designer, died the same day. PLA Daily newspaper indicated that the first five naval pilots (including Dai) conducted J-15 fighter landings and takeoffs. Test and training program officials confirmed the carrier-borne aircraft and special equipment for the landing flight had gone through strict tests, and fighter jets can be deployed on the carrier.

In December 2013, Chinese media reported that mass production of J-15s in full operational condition with combat markings had begun.

In January 2017, the carrier Liaoning, having returned to the South China Sea after its first deployment into the Western Pacific, conducted a series of take-off and landing drills with its squadron of embarked J-15 fighters.

In July 2018, Lieutenant General Zhang Honghe of the PLAAF stated that China was developing a new carrier-based aircraft to replace the J-15 due to its two crashes and a series of “unpardonable mechanical failures”. One problem with the aircraft is that it is the heaviest carrier-borne fighter in current operation anywhere, with an empty weight of  compared to the F/A-18E/F Super Hornet's 14,600 kg (though it is less than the F-14 Tomcat's weight of 19,800 kg). Weight problems are compounded when operating off Liaoning, as its STOBAR launch and recovery method further limits payload capacity.

Accidents
 In April 2016, a J-15 crashed into the ocean after experiencing a flight control system failure. The pilot, Cao Xianjian, ejected shortly before impact, below the altitude needed for the parachute to function; he was severely injured upon landing.
 On 27 April 2016, a J-15 crashed during a simulated landing when a flight control system malfunction caused the aircraft to pitch up to 80 degrees. The pilot, Zhang Chao, ejected below the altitude needed for the parachute to function; he died from injuries sustained upon landing.
 In July 2017, a J-15 suffered a left engine fire after ingesting a bird shortly after takeoff. The pilot, Yuan Wei, with the aid of instructions from air traffic controllers, performed an emergency landing and ground crews extinguished the fire.

Variants
J-15 (NATO reporting name Flanker-X2):Single-seat variant.
J-15S : Two-seat variant, first flown in 2012.
J-15T (Flanker-X2): CATOBAR operation prototypes, first seen in September 2016. Two were built.
J-15D (Flanker-X2): Two-seat electronic attack variant with EW pods and other electronic equipment installed and IRST sensor removed. Begun operational testing in December 2018.
J-15B: Improved J-15 incorporating CATOBAR launch capability from J-15T, fitted with modern fifth-generation avionics, AESA radar, new airframes, stealth coatings, and compatibility to launch PL-10 and PL-15 missiles.

Operators

People's Liberation Army Naval Air Force - 50 units in service, 55 units on order as of 2021.
 Chinese aircraft carrier Liaoning
 Chinese aircraft carrier Shandong
 Lingshui Air Base

Specifications (estimated)

See also

References 
Citations

External links 

J15 Naval Carrier Based Fighter, PLA Navy, J-15 fighter photos and introductions, AirForceWorld.com
Chinese Military Aviation
Flying Sharks, a J-15 fighter video.

2000s Chinese fighter aircraft
Carrier-based aircraft
Canard aircraft
Shenyang aircraft
Twinjets
Aircraft first flown in 2009
Fourth-generation jet fighter